The Hélène was a 34-gun Charmante class frigate of the French Navy.
In 1793 she was captured by the Spanish Navy whilst endeavouring to make her escape, and was renamed Sirena.
She was broken up in 1807.

External links
http://www.netmarine.net/bat/smarins/junon/ancien.htm

Age of Sail frigates of France
Ships built in France
Frigates of Spain
Captured ships
1791 ships
Charmante-class frigates